Reunion des Cheminots et des Sportifs de la Chapelle Saint-Luc is a French association football team founded in 1942. They are based in La Chapelle-Saint-Luc, Champagne-Ardenne, France and are currently playing in the Championnat de France Amateurs 2 Group B, the fifth tier in the French football league system. They play at the Stade SNCF in La Chapelle-Saint-Luc, which has a capacity of 1,000.

La Chapelle Saint-Luc reached the 8th round of the 2009–10 Coupe de France, losing 4–1 to FC Mulhouse.

Season-by-Season

References

Association football clubs established in 1942
1942 establishments in France
Sport in Aube
Football clubs in Grand Est